Albertson is an English language patronymic surname meaning "son of Albert" (Germanic origin, "noble-bright").  There are other spellings, including the Scandinavian Albertsen.  While Albertson is a common surname, it is uncommon as a given name.

Notable people with the surname

 Charles W. Albertson (born 1932), American politician and musician
 Chris Albertson (1931–2019), American jazz journalist, writer and record producer
 Coit Albertson (1880–1953), US actor
 Frank Albertson (1909–1964), American character actor
 Jack Albertson (1907–1981), American actor and brother of Mabel
 Joe Albertson (1906–1993), American grocer (Albertsons chain) and philanthropist
 Kathryn Albertson (1908–2002), American philanthropist
 Lillian Albertson (1881–1962), US actress and theatre producer
 Mabel Albertson (1901–1982), US actress and sister of Jack
 Nathaniel Albertson (1800–1863), American politician
R. B. Albertson, American politician
 William Albertson (1910–1972), American CPUSA leader

Notable people with the given name 

 Albertson Van Zo Post (1866–1938), American Olympic fencer and writer

Fictional characters
 Jeff Albertson, better known as Comic Book Guy, a character from The Simpsons
Tammy Jean Albertson, Glee character

See also
 Alberts (name)

Patronymic surnames
Surnames from given names